Gloria Amuche Nwosu (born 24 December 1984) is a Nigerian sprinter. She competed in the women's 4 × 400 metres relay at the 2004 Summer Olympics.

In 2005, she was suspected and was found guilty for doping by the IAAF after a doping test revealed that an elevated T/E ratio was identified in her body and was banned for two years

References

External links

1984 births
Living people
Athletes (track and field) at the 2004 Summer Olympics
Nigerian female sprinters
Olympic athletes of Nigeria
Doping cases in athletics
Nigerian sportspeople in doping cases
Place of birth missing (living people)
Olympic female sprinters
20th-century Nigerian women
21st-century Nigerian women